Darker America is a 1924 symphonic poem by American composer William Grant Still. The composition, exploring themes of sorrow, hope, and prayer, is 
a work derived from Still's studies with the modernist composer Edgard Varèse. In the work, Still uses "melodic types found in African American music such as the descending melodic curve, the pentatonic scale of the spirituals, and the 'blues scales' of the blues. The primary harmonies used were the tonic, subdominant, and dominant harmony of the spirituals." The work was first performed by Eugene Goossens on November 22, 1926 at the Aeolian Hall in New York City, New York and is about twelve minutes long.

Overview
A description of the symphonic tone poem is as follows:

See also
 List of jazz-influenced classical compositions
 List of symphonic poems

References

Further reading

External links
  (complete; 12:24)

Compositions by William Grant Still
1924 compositions